Pierrefitte is the name of several communes in France:

Pierrefitte, Corrèze
Pierrefitte, Creuse
Pierrefitte, Deux-Sèvres
Pierrefitte, Vosges

It is also part of the name of several communes:

Pierrefitte-en-Auge, in the Calvados département 
Pierrefitte-en-Beauvaisis, in the Oise département 
Pierrefitte-en-Cinglais, in the Calvados département 
Pierrefitte-ès-Bois, in the Loiret département
Pierrefitte-Nestalas, in the Hautes-Pyrénées département 
Pierrefitte-sur-Aire, in the Meuse département 
Pierrefitte-sur-Loire, in the Allier département 
Pierrefitte-sur-Sauldre, in the Loir-et-Cher département 
Pierrefitte-sur-Seine, in the Seine-Saint-Denis département
Pierrefitte–Stains station